Yours to Keep is the fourth studio album by Australian rock band Sticky Fingers, released in February 2019 through Sureshaker. It was produced by Dann Hume, at Rocking Horse Studios, Byron Bay. Hume had produced the band's previous albums. The album peaked at number four on the ARIA Albums chart.

Background 

Yours to Keep appeared in February 2019, more than two years after Sticky Fingers' third studio album, Westway (The Glitter & the Slums) (2016). Yours to Keep peaked at number four on the ARIA Albums and on the ARIA Top 100 Physical Albums charts, number three on the ARIA Digital Albums chart and number one on the ARIA Australian Artists Albums chart. The band's line-up was Paddy Cornwall, Seamus Coyle, Dylan Frost, Eric "Beaker Best" da Silva Gruener and Daniel "Freddy Crabs" Neurath.

Reception 

Matt Rocke of Rhythms Music Magazine reviewed Yours to Keep and observes, "[it] is sadly stymied and self pitying... they've stuck too close to their knitting and produced a tea cosy. In the end it hurts to say, it's just not there." Atwood Magazines James Meadows claims the band "is coming to grips with the lifestyle that has both bestowed stardom and cursed them with many inner demons." The album's tracks deal with their issues. Specifically lead vocalist Frost admitted "he struggled with alcoholism coupled with a recent diagnosis of bipolar schizophrenia." Bass guitarist Cornwall and keyboardist Neurath described "the alcoholism and rehabilitation that the entire band underwent during their year off."

Track listing

Personnel 

 Paddy Cornwall – bass guitar
 Seamus Coyle – guitar
 Dylan Frost – lead vocals, guitar
 Eric "Beaker Best" da Silva Gruener – drums, perussion
 Daniel "Freddy Crabs" Neurath – keyboards

 Dann Hume – producer, mixer
 Rhys Fletcher – engineer
 Nicholas Wilson – engineer
 Brad Teoduruk – cover

Charts

Weekly charts

Year-end charts

Release history

References

2019 albums
Sticky Fingers (band) albums